Josiane Falco (born July 21, 1988) is a female judoka from Brazil. She won a bronze medal at the 2010 Pan American Judo Championships in the women's –57 kg event.

References

External links 
 

Brazilian female judoka
1988 births
Living people
21st-century Brazilian women
20th-century Brazilian women